Frank Lee Foust was a college football player.

University of North Carolina
Foust was a prominent tackle for the North Carolina Tar Heels football teams of the University of North Carolina from 1900 to 1903. One Dr. R. B. Lawson picked Foust as a guard on his all-time North Carolina football team.

1902
Foust was captain and All-Southern in 1902. The team tied Virginia in its rivalry game.

1903
Foust was selected All-Southern by John Heisman in 1903.

References

All-Southern college football players
American football tackles
North Carolina Tar Heels football players